Naval Support Activity Bahrain (or NSA Bahrain) is a United States Navy base, situated in the Kingdom of Bahrain and is home to U.S. Naval Forces Central Command and United States Fifth Fleet.

Occupying the original territory of the British Royal Navy base known as HMS Jufair, USN presence was established on-site during World War II. Transferred to the U.S. government in 1971, NSA Bahrain today provides support through logistical, supply, and protection as well as a Navy Exchange facility and Morale, Welfare and Recreation programs to both United States Armed Forces and coalition assets. It is the primary base in the region for the naval and marine activities in support of Operation Enduring Freedom (OEF) and formerly Operation Iraqi Freedom (OIF), to include when the latter was changed to Operation New Dawn (OND) until the end of the Iraq War.

The commander of Navy Region Europe, Africa, Southwest Asia is responsible for NSA Bahrain and Camp Lemonnier in Djibouti. Navy Region Europe, Africa, Southwest Asia is responsible to Navy Installations Command, though it has close coordination with Naval Forces Central Command.

History
The first presence of the British Royal Navy in the Persian Gulf came about from the need to control pirates raiding British shipping east of Suez, especially the East India Company routes to India, when it appointed the first Senior Naval Officer, Persian Gulf. In the early 1820s the rulers of Bahrain, Salman and Abdullah Al Khalifa, signed an agreement to try to limit piracy in the area. This was strengthened in 1835 through an agreement signed specifically with the Royal Navy, which addressed the need to stop pirates operating in the area and limit the slave trade. In 1902 the first oil was discovered in the area, but commercial extraction did not begin until 1925 when Frank Holmes was given the first license, though oil was not exported from Bahrain until 1932.

HMS Juffair

After the death of Sheikh Isa in 1932, having handed control of the state in 1921 under British diplomatic pressure to his son Hamad, his advisor Charles Belgrave with whom he had modernized the state systems and key infrastructure, suggested that they should come to an agreement with the British to open a permanent Royal Navy base within the state. HMS Juffair opened on 13 April 1935, as part of the port at Mina Salman. It was bombed by the Italian Air Force during World War II, as part of an Axis Forces effort to cut-off one of the three Allied Forces sources of oil in the Persian Gulf.

US Navy establishment
As a result of the raid, and the United States' entry into World War II from December 1941, the Royal Navy extended an invitation to the US Navy, allowing the USN to deploy a small detachment. Post-WW2, the posting was recognized as the U.S. Middle East Force from 1948, a small shore facility that provided logistical and communications support to Marine Expeditionary vessels.

In 1971, with Bahrain gaining independence from the British Empire, the permanent Royal Navy presence in Bahrain officially ended. With the agreement of the Emir, the USN immediately took on the entire  site, and eight years later the location was named Administrative Support Unit (ASU) Bahrain. In an effort to more accurately reflect the increasing role of United States Navy activities in the region, the organization was renamed Administrative Support Unit Southwest Asia in 1992.

Present
In 1997, under the aegis of the Military Construction Program, facilities located in Juffair saw an increased buildup, resulting in what is known today as Naval Support Activity Bahrain.

In 2003, facilities at NSA Bahrain began expanding after Operation Iraqi Freedom began.

In 2006, a large food court, known as the "Freedom Souq" and an expanded Navy Exchange opened, expanding morale and welfare support to service members and tenant commands.

In 2010, the Navy embarked on a five-year, $580-million project to expand the base, proposing to essentially double the size of the current 62-acre facility. The first phase of construction included a new perimeter wall and security gate along with several new utility buildings.  The second phase expanded the port operations with a new harbor patrol facility and included a small-craft basin. New barracks, a dining facility, a renovated recreation center and administrative buildings were also constructed. The final phase included a flyover bridge connecting NSA Bahrain to the port facility at Mina Salman.

In 2021 NSA Bahrain earned the DOD Installation Excellence Award as one of five recipients of the 2021 Commander in Chief’s Annual Award for Installation Excellence, which recognizes the outstanding and innovative efforts of the people who operate and maintain U.S. military installations. NSA Bahrain, U.S. Central Command’s only main operating base, earned the esteemed accolade for providing phenomenal shore support for 31 forward deployed U.S. and coalition warships, enhancing warfighter readiness and lethality against the backdrop of heightened regional tensions with Iran and the COVID-19 pandemic. NSA Bahrain completed the $49 million construction of the Mina Salman pier, increasing berthing capacity by 50 percent, and an $18.9 million port security barrier. Naval Support Activity Bahrain has an important role in facilitating strong U.S. relations with the Kingdom of Bahrain.

See also
United States Navy submarine bases

References

Further reading

 Official Page for U.S. Naval Forces Central Command
 Official Page for Naval Support Activity Bahrain
 Overview
 
 

Naval Support Activities of the United States Navy
Military installations established in the 1970s
Buildings and structures in Manama
Military installations of the United States in Bahrain